The 2000 Ivy League Baseball Championship Series took place at Bill Clarke Field in Princeton, New Jersey on May 6, 2000.  The series matched the regular season champions of each of the league's two divisions.  , the winner of the series, claimed their second title and the Ivy League's automatic berth in the 2000 NCAA Division I baseball tournament.   It was Princeton's fifth appearance in the Championship Series, all of which were consecutive.

Dartmouth made their first appearance in the Championship Series.

Results

References

Ivy League Baseball Championship Series
Tournament
Ivy League Baseball Championship Series